Viracucha is a genus of South American wandering spiders first described by Pekka T. Lehtinen in 1967.

Species
, Viracucha contained seven species:
Viracucha andicola (Simon, 1906) – Bolivia
Viracucha exilis (Mello-Leitão, 1936) – Brazil
Viracucha mammifer  – Brazil
Viracucha misionesicus (Mello-Leitão, 1945) – Argentina
Viracucha paraguayensis (Strand, 1909) – Brazil, Paraguay
Viracucha ridleyi (F. O. Pickard-Cambridge, 1897) – Brazil
Viracucha silvicola (Soares & Soares, 1946) – Brazil

References

Araneomorphae genera
Ctenidae
Spiders of South America
Taxa named by Pekka T. Lehtinen